The Alba Party is a Scottish nationalist and pro-independence political party in Scotland, founded in February 2021, led by former first minister of Scotland Alex Salmond. Salmond launched the party's 2021 Scottish Parliament election campaign in March 2021, with the party standing list-only candidates. Two Members of Parliament (MPs) in the UK House of Commons defected from the Scottish National Party (SNP) to the Alba Party on 27 March 2021, and several former SNP MPs also joined the party. No Alba Party candidate has been elected at any election.

History

Background
Alex Salmond served as leader of the Scottish National Party (SNP) from 1990 to 2000 and again from 2004 to 2014, and as First Minister of Scotland from 2007 to 2014. He was succeeded in both positions by his former deputy, Nicola Sturgeon. Salmond resigned from the SNP in 2018 following accusations of sexual misconduct, which he denied. He was acquitted of charges made against him in a subsequent court case in March 2020. Later that year, the possibility of Salmond leading a new party supporting Scottish independence was discussed, in the context of a feud between Sturgeon and Salmond, who accused Sturgeon's "inner circle" of plotting against him. Polling conducted in July 2020 reported that 40% of those who voted SNP at the 2019 general election would back a new independence-supporting party if it was led by Salmond.

Founding
The party was founded and registered with the Electoral Commission by the retired television producer Laurie Flynn on 8 February 2021. Alba (pronounced  in Scottish Gaelic and Scottish English,  in British English) is the Gaelic name for Scotland. On 26 March 2021, Salmond announced at the party's election launch that he had joined the party and would become the new leader, taking over from Flynn, after "discussions with Laurie and others from other list parties" over the prior weeks. During the announcement of candidates, it gained its first elected member, councillor Chris McEleny, who previously had served as the SNP group leader on Inverclyde Council and was due to be an SNP candidate for the 2021 Scottish Parliament election. The MPs Kenny MacAskill and Neale Hanvey, as well as the former MP Corri Wilson, joined the party on 26 March. The SNP's national equalities convener, Lynne Anderson, also defected to Alba. BBC Scotland's political editor Glenn Campbell said the list of defectors to the party included "those who fear that gender self-identification for trans people poses a threat to women's rights" as well as politicians who personally support Salmond and his approach to Scottish independence.

2021 Scottish Parliament election
The party announced plans to stand at least four candidates for the list vote in every region in the 2021 Scottish Parliament election. Intended candidates include Salmond standing for the North East Scotland region as well as former SNP members Chris McEleny standing for the West Scotland region, Eva Comrie for the Mid Scotland and Fife region (for which she was previously the SNP candidate), and Cynthia Guthrie for the South Scotland region. Caroline McAllister, the SNP's women's convener and depute leader of West Dunbartonshire council, joined the party and was announced as a candidate in the West Scotland region. The party endorsed voting for the SNP in the constituency vote while voting for the Alba Party for the list vote, in order to ensure more pro-independence MSPs are elected.

On 26 March 2021, the Leader of Action for Independence, former SNP MSP Dave Thompson, stated that the party would be standing down all their candidates in order to support Alba. Tommy Sheridan, a former MSP and convicted perjurer who had been seeking election as part of Action for Independence, joined the Alba Party on 28 March. On 29 March, former professional boxer Alex Arthur was announced as a list candidate, whilst former SNP MPs George Kerevan and Tasmina Ahmed-Sheikh and former MSP Jim Eadie joined later that day.

Sturgeon and the SNP criticised the new party, questioning Salmond's fitness to take public office given the sexual harassment claims against him. Sturgeon said she would refuse to have any dealings with Salmond unless he apologises to the women who had accused him of harassment. Lorna Slater, co-leader of the Scottish Greens, also criticised the new party, describing it as "a party thrown together by a disgruntled ex-first minister as part of his vendetta against our first minister." Neil Mackay called the party "Trumpian" and "a hotchpotch of social conservatives and nationalist fundamentalists" in his Herald column. The party was also criticised after it was revealed that candidate Alex Arthur had tweeted anti-vaccine statements and remarks referring to Romanians as fat and using the pig emoji. The party was further criticised as "cynical" for using women's rights as a campaign issue despite making misleading statements about one of their candidates' role in Glasgow City Council's equal pay dispute, Salmond's history of complaints for inappropriate sexual conduct, and candidate Jim Walker referring to Sturgeon as "a cow".

During the Alba Party's Women's Conference, Central Scotland candidate Margaret Lynch claimed the Scottish Government was funding LGBT rights groups that wanted to lower the age of consent to 10 years old. The SNP described this as "deeply homophobic and untrue" and Lynch was condemned by Scottish Greens co-leader Patrick Harvie. When asked by The Scotsman whether Lynch's position was also that of the party, Alba refused to comment. Former SNP councillor Austin Sheridan left the Alba Party, describing Lynch's comments as "hideous" and stating there was "no way I can be part of a party that tolerates such views." Lynch later clarified her comments in an article in The Times, in which she continued to claim that trans rights would allow access by "sexual predators", and in The Scotsman repeated her accusation that LGBT organisations which received "£2.8 million of Scottish public funds" have signed a letter advocating lowering the age of consent to 10 years of age. LGBT charity Stonewall called on Lynch to retract her false allegation and apologise.

The party failed to win any seats in the election, after attracting only 1.7% of the vote. Salmond said that the party's results had been "creditable" given its recent founding. Other commentators argued that Alba had benefitted Sturgeon individually by removing some of her most vocal internal party critics from the political scene.

A few months after the election, on 28 June 2021, the Electoral Commission rejected all seven of Alba's official descriptions. In a round up of recent decisions, the Commission said all seven proposed ballot paper slogans failed to "meet the requirements of a description".

2022 Scottish local elections 
For the 2022 Scottish local elections, the Alba Party announced that 111 candidates would be standing in councils across Scotland to win as many as possible. Salmond launched the party's manifesto at the Caird Hall in Dundee with the main aim to elect the first councillors under the Alba banner. Ahead of the election, Salmond said that he was confident that the party would win seats.

The party failed to win any seats at the election, attracting 0.7% of first preference votes. All of the councillors who defected to the party from the SNP failed to be elected, including Christopher McEleny, the party's General Secretary who only received 126 votes. In response to the result, Salmond expressed his disappointment with the outcome and said that it would take time for the party to build enough support to have candidates elected.

Further activities
The week after the elections, Kamran Butt, who although not elected was the most successful Alba candidate, defected to the SNP. He claimed that joining the SNP was the only way that independence and strong governance can be delivered in Scotland. The same day, Salmond stated that all pro-independence parties needed to work together if Scottish independence was to be achieved. He said that the proposed 2023 independence referendum would need to take place, but if it didn't then there would be huge political change in Scotland in which Alba would play a strong part.

In December 2022, polling suggested that Alba could win seats at the next Scottish Parliament election. 34% of voters who backed the SNP in the 2021 Scottish Parliament constituency vote said they would vote for Alba with their regional list ballot in order to return a greater number of pro-independence MSPs, with 19% support overall.

Policies
The Alba Party is Scottish nationalist, advocating Scottish independence, as an "immediate necessity". It describes its objective as being to build a "socially just and environmentally responsible" Scotland. The party proposes that, now that the reign of Queen Elizabeth II has ended, Scotland should become a republic with "an elected head of state with similar powers to the Uachtarán na hÉireann (the President of Ireland)", with the final document of a written constitution for this purpose to be confirmed by a referendum. Its platform also opposed proposed changes to the Gender Recognition Act until a citizens assembly can be formed to discuss and debate the perceived conflicts between sex and gender based rights.

Alba supports a future independent Scotland joining the European Free Trade Association (EFTA). The party describes itself as social democratic on its website, and has politicians with a variety of positions as members, such as Tommy Sheridan on the left-wing, Kenny MacAskill on the centre-left, and Tasmina Ahmed-Sheikh on the centre-right.

In March 2022, Salmond unveiled a 38-page "Wee Alba Book" which makes the "fundamental case for independence", covering issues such as Europe, currency and borders.

Leadership

Leader of the Alba Party

Depute Leader of the Alba Party

General Secretary of the Alba Party
 Christopher McEleny, 4 June 2021–present

Leader of the parliamentary party, House of Commons
 Neale Hanvey (Kirkcaldy and Cowdenbeath), 2021–present

Representatives

MPs

Councillors
Following Salmond's announcement, eleven councillors had joined the party by the end of March 2021. All eleven had been elected as SNP candidates, though three had already left that party. This included three councillors on Aberdeenshire Council and two on North Lanarkshire Council.

Alba nominated 111 candidates for the 2022 Scottish local elections, including the 13 incumbent councillors who were elected as members of other parties before joining Alba. None were elected.

Electoral performance

Scottish Parliament

Local elections

Notes

References

External links 

2021 establishments in Scotland
Nationalist parties in the United Kingdom
Political parties established in 2021
Organisations based in Edinburgh
Scottish independence
Scottish nationalist parties
Organisations that oppose transgender rights in the United Kingdom
Scottish republicanism
Alex Salmond